This is a list of listed buildings in North Ayrshire. The list is split out by parish.

 List of listed buildings in Ardrossan, North Ayrshire
 List of listed buildings in Beith, North Ayrshire
 List of listed buildings in Cumbrae, North Ayrshire
 List of listed buildings in Dalry, North Ayrshire
 List of listed buildings in Dreghorn, North Ayrshire
 List of listed buildings in Dundonald, North Ayrshire
 List of listed buildings in Irvine, North Ayrshire
 List of listed buildings in Kilbirnie, North Ayrshire
 List of listed buildings in Kilbride, North Ayrshire
 List of listed buildings in Kilmory, North Ayrshire
 List of listed buildings in Kilwinning, North Ayrshire
 List of listed buildings in Largs, North Ayrshire
 List of listed buildings in Millport, North Ayrshire
 List of listed buildings in Saltcoats, North Ayrshire
 List of listed buildings in Stevenston, North Ayrshire
 List of listed buildings in West Kilbride, North Ayrshire

North Ayrshire